Julian Barham (born February 23, 1965) is a former professional tennis player from the United States.

Biography
Barham, who comes from Riverside, California, played collegiate tennis at UC Irvine before turning professional. He earned All-American honors in 1987, having reached the NCAA championship doubles final with Darren Yates.

From 1988 to 1989, he competed on the professional tour, mostly as a doubles player. Partnering Peter Wright, Barham featured in the main draw of the men's doubles at the 1989 Australian Open.

Challenger titles

Doubles: (1)

References

External links
 
 

1965 births
Living people
American male tennis players
Sportspeople from Riverside, California
UC Irvine Anteaters men's tennis players
Tennis people from California